Hlemmur bus station was one of the two main bus terminals for Strætó bs in Reykjavík, Iceland. , the only main terminal is Lækjartorg. All the red 'trunk' routes operated from Hlemmur, while the green general routes all stopped there.

The 2002 documentary Hlemmur tells the story of homeless people who spent their time in and around the bus station.

In 2015 it was announced that Hlemmur Station would close and be replaced by a food court.

References

External links
  Strætó bs official website 
 Strætó bs official website 

Buildings and structures in Reykjavík
Transport in Reykjavík
Road transport in Iceland
Bus stations in Europe